Ambit is a quarterly literary periodical published in the United Kingdom. The magazine was founded in 1959 by Martin Bax, a London novelist and consultant paediatrician. The office of the magazine is in London, and the HQ is registered in Norfolk.

Uniting art, prose, poetry and reviews, the magazine appears quarterly and is distributed internationally. Notable Ambit contributors have included J. G. Ballard, Eduardo Paolozzi, Ralph Steadman, Carol Ann Duffy, Fleur Adcock, Peter Blake and David Hockney. Michael Foreman was art director for 50 years. Derek Birdsall, Alan Kitching and John Morgan Studio are notable designers. Despite the wealth of recognisable names, Ambit also features the work of new, unpublished writers.

In the sixties Ambit became well known for testing the boundaries and social conventions and published many anti-establishment pieces, including an issue with works written under the influence of drugs. Ballard became fiction editor alongside Geoff Nicholson, and Duffy joined Henry Graham as Poetry Editor. 

In 2013, poet Briony Bax (and daughter of the poet Adrian Mitchell) became editor, successfully transitioning Ambit to gain charitable status, with the intention to continue Ambit's mission of using art and literature to expand upon the times. Kate Pemberton became fiction editor, with various poetry editors, and sculptor, Olivia Bax as art editor.  The magazine held launches at the Tate Gallery and is a regular in Soho, although much of the legacy of Ambit began at the Chelsea Arts Club. After 7 years, Briony Bax stepped up as editor emeritus, after recruiting author, poet and performer, Kirsty Allison (who was first published in Ambit in 2007) first as managing editor, then as editor.  

Kirsty Allison introduced Lias Saoudi (Fat White Family) as a guest editor for the first Ambit Pop issue, Ambit 243, which invited him to commission and expand on the Poems, Stories and Art legacy of Ambit.  This issue published Rob Doyle, Jenni Fagan, Ben Myers, Wayne Horse, Neal Fox (Le Gun), Zaffar Kunial and more.  After an introduction by illustration editor, Dr Mireille Fauchon, Ambit is now designed by Stephen Barrett  (who also designed Kirsty Allison's debut novel, Psychomachia (Wrecking Ball Press).

Review
Ambit magazine was described by artist Ralph Steadman as "a surreptitious peek inside a private world. Without it such vital sparks of inspiration could well be lost forever.". The magazine professes not to include in its publication criticisms, essays, articles and lengthy reviews but prefers including real work, the likes and dislikes associated with the readers, creating never a dull moment and always sparking off feedbacks. To quote Carol Ann Duffy, "Ambit continues to surprise, exasperate and delight". Two issues of Ambit a year are put together entirely from unsolicited, previously unpublished poetry and short fiction submissions. One is now a Pop issue, with a guest editor.  The other issue is created from winners of the Annual Ambit Awards for Poems, Stories and Art.

References

External links
Ambit website
Interview with Martin Bax on history of Ambit
Ambit statistics website
Ambit about website

1959 establishments in the United Kingdom
Literary magazines published in the United Kingdom
Quarterly magazines published in the United Kingdom
Magazines published in London
Magazines established in 1959
Poetry magazines published in the United Kingdom